Noel Anthony Ratcliffe (born 17 January 1945) is an Australian professional golfer.

Ratcliffe turned to golf exceptionally late for a future professional, and didn't own a set of clubs until he was twenty-one. He studied pharmacy and worked for an insurance company and in public service before turning professional in 1974. Like many Australian golfers of his era, he divided his time between the PGA Tour of Australia and the European Tour. In his regular career he won three titles in Australasia and two in Europe, where his best year was 1978 when he finished 11th on the Order of Merit.

Since turning fifty he has been successful on the European Seniors Tour, where he topped the Order of Merit in 2000, made the top five on four other occasions, and won eight tournaments. He was the second man to win over one million Euro on the tour.

Amateur wins
1969 New South Wales Medal
1971 New South Wales Medal

Professional wins (16)

European Tour wins (2)

European Tour playoff record (0–1)

PGA Tour of Australasia wins (1)

PGA Tour of Australasia playoff record (1–0)

Other Australasian wins (2)
1974 Australian PGA Assistants Championship
1976 Huon Open (Papua New Guinea)

European Senior Tour wins (8)

European Senior Tour playoff record (0–2)

Other senior wins (3)
1995 Australian Senior Open
2001 Australian PGA Seniors Championship
2008 Polygiene Australian PGA Seniors Championship

Results in major championships

Note: Ratcliffe only played in The Open Championship.

CUT = missed the half-way cut (3rd round cut in 1978 and 1981 Open Championships)
"T" = tied

Team appearances
Amateur
Commonwealth Tournament (representing Australia): 1971
Eisenhower Trophy (representing Australia): 1972
Australian Men's Interstate Teams Matches (representing New South Wales): 1970 (winners), 1971, 1973 (winners)

Professional
Praia d'El Rey European Cup: 1997 (winners)

References

External links

Australian male golfers
PGA Tour of Australasia golfers
European Tour golfers
European Senior Tour golfers
Golfers from Sydney
1945 births
Living people